The 2013 Distalnet Tennis Cup was a professional tennis tournament played on clay courts. It was the seventh edition of the tournament which was part of the 2013 ATP Challenger Tour. It took place in Todi, Italy between 1 and 7 July 2013.

Singles main draw entrants

Seeds

 1 Rankings are as of June 24, 2013.

Other entrants
The following players received wildcards into the singles main draw:
  Andrea Arnaboldi
  Marco Cecchinato
  Thomas Fabbiano
  Albert Ramos

The following players received entry using a protected ranking:
  Pere Riba

The following players received entry from the qualifying draw:
  Richard Becker
  Alberto Brizzi
  Mate Delić
  Adelchi Virgili

Champions

Singles

 Pere Riba def.  Santiago Giraldo 7–6(7–5), 2–6, 7–6(8–6)

Doubles

 Santiago Giraldo /  Cristian Rodríguez def.  Andrea Arnaboldi /  Gianluca Naso 4–6, 7–6(7–2), [10–3]

External links
Official Website

Distalnet Tennis Cup
Internazionali di Tennis Città dell'Aquila
2013 in Italian tennis